Helmut Fottner (24 December 1927 – 1 September 2009) was a German footballer who played for 1860 Munich, SV Saar 05 Saarbrücken, Rot-Weiss Essen, Sportclub Enschede, GVAV and the Saarland national team as a forward.

References

1927 births
2009 deaths
German footballers
Saar footballers
Footballers from Munich
Association football forwards
Saarland international footballers
TSV 1860 Munich players
SV Saar 05 Saarbrücken players
Rot-Weiss Essen players
Sportclub Enschede players
FC Groningen players
German expatriate footballers
German expatriate sportspeople in the Netherlands
Expatriate footballers in the Netherlands